Ronald Alfred Sydney Bacon (born 4 March 1935) is an English former professional footballer who played as a winger for two clubs in the Football League, making 170 appearances.

Early life
Ronald Alfred Sydney Bacon was born on 4 March 1935 in Fakenham, Norfolk.

Career
Bacon began his professional career in 1955 with Norwich City, and he made 42 League appearances for them. Bacon then moved to Gillingham, making a further 128 appearances in the League. Bacon later played non-league football with King's Lynn.

References

1935 births
Living people
English footballers
Gillingham F.C. players
Norwich City F.C. players
King's Lynn F.C. players
English Football League players
People from Fakenham
Association football wingers